Zhou Yixuan (born December 11, 1990) is a Chinese rapper, singer and actor. He is a member and leader of Chinese-South Korean group UNIQ under Yuehua Entertainment and Chinese group New Storm which debuted in 2019 after winning the survival show All For One.

Early life 
Yixuan was born in Shengzhou, Zhejiang, China in the town of Chengguan on December 11, 1990. He attended Shengzhou No.2 Middle School and went on to attend Beijing Contemporary Music Academy and was scouted by Yuehua Entertainment at a dance competition.

Career

2014–2015: Debut with UNIQ 

On September 24, 2014, Yixuan was introduced as the 5th member of UNIQ. The group officially debuted on October 16, 2014, with their single, Falling in Love. Yixuan co-wrote the Chinese version of the song. In 2015, Yixuan co-wrote the Chinese versions of three songs for UNIQ's first EP, EOEO优+ which includes EOEO, Luv Again, and Listen to Me.

2016–present: Acting career and solo activities 
Yixuan made cameo appearances in the 2016 films MBA Partners and Jeffrey Lau's A Chinese Odyssey Part Three and officially made his acting debut in the web drama Female President in May 2016.

Yixuan filmed the drama Time City, starring Korean actress Park Minyoung. He landed his first lead role in Marna starring alongside his labelmates, Cosmic Girls' Xuanyi and Meiqi, and Produce 101/Idol Producer contestant Zhu Zhengting. Soon after, Yixuan was cast in Step Up: Year of the Dance, a spin-off of the Step Up franchise. The dances in the movie were choreographed by Willdabeast Adams and Janelle Ginestra. He then filmed The Origin of Love, a web drama based on the popular web novel, Desolate Era by I Eat Tomatoes.

In May 2017, Yixuan participated in The Rap of China, a rap competition. He passed four rounds and was eliminated during Team Selection.

In August 2017, Yixuan judged the top 20 singers of a singing competition held by the live broadcasting app Inke. The winner of the competition had the opportunity to sing the Mr. Inke theme song with Yixuan. The song of the same name was released in October.

In September 2017, Yixuan starred in the all-star filled comedy, To B or Not to B, playing various roles.

Yixuan released singles Do Back on November 23 and GIRL GIRL GIRL on December 4 ahead of his first solo EP release. The EP titled OS was released on December 27 which included a third single, Want a Trip. The music video for GIRL GIRL GIRL was released on March 30 the following year.

Yixuan was awarded the Emerging Fashion Figure award at the 2017 Asian Influence Awards Ceremony. He was also awarded the Emerging Honorary Certificate at The 2017 Belt and Road Fashion Culture Industry Forum. Yixuan was awarded the 2018 Most Anticipated Star Traveler at the 2017 Sina Travel Annual Awards.

Yixuan became a cast member for The Chamber of Secrets Escape, a new task based variety show on Hunan TV which premiered in April 2018. Yixuan wrote the lyrics for UNIQ's new single titled 不曾离开过 which was released in April 2018.

In May 2018, Yixuan had a cameo role in fellow band member Wenhan's drama, Basketball Fever. In September 2018, his movie Water Bro was released in which he played the lead role, Xia Bing and starring alongside Thai actor New Thitipoom.

Yixuan took part in the Chinese survival show, All For One with fellow Yuehua trainees and won in the finals, gaining the very first place. His group, New Storm, debuted in 2019 with "Get High".

Discography

Extended plays

Singles

Promotional Singles

Production credits

Filmography

Film

Television series

Television shows

Awards

Music Program Awards

Global Chinese Music
Global Chinese Music is a Chinese music program.

References 

1990 births
Living people
People from Shengzhou
Uniq (band) members
Chinese male film actors
Chinese male television actors
Male actors from Shaoxing
21st-century Chinese male singers
Musicians from Shaoxing
Singers from Zhejiang
Chinese K-pop singers